Glaucocharis albilinealis is a moth in the family Crambidae. It was described by George Hampson in 1896. It is found in Myanmar and India (Assam, Bengal).

References

Diptychophorini
Moths described in 1896